Holder Ocante da Silva (born 12 January 1988 in Bissau) is a Guinea-Bissauan sprinter who specializes in the 100 metres. He was born in Bissau. His personal best time is 10.36 seconds, achieved in July 2009 in Lisbon.

He competed at the 2007 World Championships and the 2008 Olympic Games without progressing to the second round. In Beijing he placed 5th in his heat in a time of 10.58 seconds.

At the 2012 Summer Olympics Men's 100m event, Silva progressed from the preliminaries, setting a seasonal best time of 10.69 seconds, before being eliminated in the first round.

International competitions

Personal bests
Outdoor
100 metres – 10.36 (+0.5 m/s, Salamanca 2009)
200 metres – 21.01 (+1.4 m/s, Salamanca 2009)
Indoor
60 metres – 6.80 (Pombal 2009)
200 metres – 22.08 (Espinho 2008)

References

External links

1988 births
Living people
Sportspeople from Bissau
Bissau-Guinean male sprinters
Athletes (track and field) at the 2008 Summer Olympics
Athletes (track and field) at the 2012 Summer Olympics
Athletes (track and field) at the 2016 Summer Olympics
Olympic athletes of Guinea-Bissau
World Athletics Championships athletes for Guinea-Bissau
S.L. Benfica athletes
Athletes (track and field) at the 2007 All-Africa Games
African Games competitors for Guinea-Bissau